The by-election for the British House of Commons constituency of Blackpool North, in Blackpool, Lancashire, England, was held on 13 March 1962.  This was the last parliamentary by-election in England to be held on a day other than Thursday.

The result was a hold for the Conservative Party.

See also
Blackpool North (UK Parliament constituency)
List of United Kingdom by-elections

References

1962 elections in the United Kingdom
1962 in England
March 1962 events in the United Kingdom
1960s in Lancashire
Politics of Blackpool
History of Blackpool
By-elections to the Parliament of the United Kingdom in Lancashire constituencies